A woog (from wâc, a Middle High German hydronym) is the local name for a body of still water in parts of southwest Germany. A woog may be of natural origin or manmade.

Distribution of the name 
The name is used for waterbodies in the German states of Rhineland-Palatinate (being especially common in the Palatine Forest), the Saarland, in South Hesse (commonly in the Odenwald) and in the state of Baden-Württemberg (Nordbaden); even the names of roads or settlements are derived from such bodies of water. Examples are:

Baden-Württemberg 
 Woogsee, natural lake near Rastatt in the basin of the Kinzig-Murg-Rinne

Hesse 
 Großer Woog, reservoir on the Darmbach

Rhineland-Palatinate 
 Biedenbacher Woog, reservoir on the Leinbach
 Büttelwoog, campsite near Dahn
 Dämmelswoog, reservoir near Fischbach
 Eiswoog, reservoir on the Eisbach
 Finsterthaler Woog, reservoir on the Leinbach
 Franzosenwoog, former reservoir on the Hochspeyerbach
 Gelterswoog, reservoir of tributaries of the Aschbach
 Hammerwoog, reservoir in Kaiserslautern
 Kammerwoog, former woog on the Nahe in Idar-Oberstein, today a section of the river
 Katzenwoog, reservoir on the Erlenbach near Kaiserslautern
 Kolbenwoog, reservoir on a tributary of the Aschbach
 Mörstadter Woog, reservoir on the northern perimeter of Mörstadt
 Mühlwoog, reservoir on the Leinbach, just before its confluence with the Hochspeyerbach
 Niederhausener Woog (also Niederhausener reservoir), reservoir der Nahe between Norheim and Niederhausen
 Pfälzerwoog (also Pfalzwoog), reservoir on a right tributary of the Saarbach
 Salzwoog, district of Lemberg, named after an old reservoir on the Salzbach
 Scheidelberger Woog, nature reserve between Miesau and Hütschenhausen
 Schweinswoog, reservoir on the Eußerbach
 Seewoog, reservoir on the Leinbach near Waldleiningen
 Sixmeisterwoog reservoir on the Aggenbach near Otterberg
 Spießwoog, reservoir near Fischbach
 Stüdenwoog reservoir on the Eppenbrunner Bach
 Vogelwoog, reservoir and surrounding nature reserve on the edge of Kaiserslautern
 Woogfelsen rocks, a heritage site on the Biedenbacher Woog in Frankenstein (Pfalz)

Saarland 
 Alter Woog, road name in the old town of St. Wendel
 Am Altwoog, road name in the Neunkirchen district of Furpach
 Merwoog, road name in Kirrberg derived from an old reservoir on the Lambsbach
 Möhlwoog, reservoir on the Erbach near Homburg-Jägersburg
 Woogbachtal (also Ensheimer Gelösch), valley with ponds near Saarbrücken-Ensheim Airport
 Zum Altwoog, road name in Fürth im Ostertal

References 

Hydrogeology
Hydronymy